Centre for Policy Development is a public policy think tank in Australia. CPD claims to be independent and non-partisan.

Personnel

Past research fellows
Mark Bahnisch
Eva Cox
John Quiggin

References

External links

Think tanks based in Australia
2007 establishments in Australia